Jack MacDonald may refer to:
Jack MacDonald (communist) (1888–1941), Scottish-Canadian communist
Jack MacDonald (Hamilton politician) (1927–2010), politician, businessman, and journalist in Hamilton, Ontario, Canada
Jack MacDonald (footballer) (born 1927), Australian rules footballer
Jack Macdonald (sportsman) (1907–1982), New Zealand sportsman

See also
Jack McDonald (disambiguation)
John MacDonald (disambiguation)